Silene vallesia, common name Valais catchfly, is a species of flowering plant in the family Caryophyllaceae.

Description
It is a perennial pubescent sticky plant with ascending flowering stems. The petals are pale pink, bifid, with deep oval lobes. Flowers bloom from June to August.

Distribution
This species is widespread throughout the western Alps to Apennines.

Habitat

References
Biolib
Luirig.altervista
Acta Plantarum

vallesia
Plants described in 1759
Taxa named by Carl Linnaeus